Clarence Norman Brunsdale (July 9, 1891January 27, 1978) was an American politician who served as the 24th Governor of North Dakota and a United States senator from the state of North Dakota.

Biography
Clarence Norman Brunsdale was born in Sherbrooke, Steele County, North Dakota. he was the son of  Knute H. Brunsdale  (1855–1899) and  Anna Margaret (Nordgaard) Brunsdale (1860–1927), both of whom were of Norwegian immigrant heritage.  He was educated in public schools and the Bruflat Academy at Portland, North Dakota. In 1913, he graduated from Luther College in Decorah, Iowa. He returned to Portland, teaching at Bruflat Academy and worked the family farm operations in Traill and Steele counties.

Career
Brunsdale served in the North Dakota State Senate (1927–34, 1941–51). He was an alternate delegate to Republican National Convention from North Dakota  (1940) and a  member of Republican National Committee from North Dakota, (1948–52). He was Governor of North Dakota from 1951 to 1957 and  U.S. Senator from November 19, 1959 to August 7, 1960. As governor, Brunsdale was an avid supporter of water development projects. During his administration Garrison Dam was completed and the Legislature established the Garrison Diversion Conservancy District. The early 1950s also saw the establishment of the Highway Department and the passage of major highway legislation. Education, agriculture, and mental health issues were also important to Governor Brunsdale. In 1959, Brunsdale was appointed to the United States Senate upon the death of Senator William Langer. Brunsdale voted in favor of the Civil Rights Act of 1960. Brunsdale was not a candidate for election to the vacancy and Quentin Burdick was narrowly elected to the seat in a 1960 special election.

Personal life
He was married to Carrie Lajord (1890–1982) on August 30, 1925, and they had two daughters, Margaret Marie (Larson) and Helen Lucille (Williams). Brunsdale died at Mayville, North Dakota in 1978. He was buried in Mayville Cemetery, Mayville, Traill County, North Dakota.
 Brunsdale was a Lutheran.

References

External links

1891 births
1978 deaths
Luther College (Iowa) alumni
People from Steele County, North Dakota
American Lutherans
Farmers from North Dakota
Presidents pro tempore of the North Dakota Senate
Republican Party North Dakota state senators
Republican Party governors of North Dakota
Republican Party United States senators from North Dakota
20th-century American politicians
American people of Norwegian descent
20th-century Lutherans